Philidris notiala is a species of ant in the genus Philidris. Described by Zhou and Zheng in 1998, the species is endemic to China.

References

Dolichoderinae
Insects described in 1998
Hymenoptera of Asia
Insects of China